Jonathon Brent Kalinski (born May 25, 1987) is a former Canadian professional ice hockey left winger who played parts of two National Hockey League (NHL) seasons as a member of the Philadelphia Flyers.

Playing career

The Philadelphia Flyers selected Kalinski in the sixth round, 152nd overall, of the 2007 NHL Entry Draft. Kalinski scored his first NHL goal on December 30, 2008 against Cory Schneider of the Vancouver Canucks.

On July 20, 2011, the Flyers announced they reached an agreement with Kalinski on a one-year contract extension. During the 2011-12 season, Kalinski was traded from the Flyers to the Tampa Bay Lightning, along with a 2012 or 2013 2nd-round pick and a 2013 4th-round pick, for Pavel Kubina on February 18, 2012.

On September 18, 2012, with the NHL lockout affecting his NHL interest as a free agent, Kalinski signed a one-year AHL contract with the Hershey Bears.

Career statistics

References

External links
 

1987 births
Living people
Adirondack Phantoms players
Canadian ice hockey left wingers
Hershey Bears players
Minnesota State Mavericks men's ice hockey players
Norfolk Admirals players
People from the Municipal District of Bonnyville No. 87
Philadelphia Flyers draft picks
Philadelphia Flyers players
Philadelphia Phantoms players
Bonnyville Pontiacs players

Minnesota State University, Mankato alumni